The 2022 Winter Cup was an artistic gymnastics competition held at the Ford Center at The Star in Frisco. Like the previous year it included both men's and women's artistic gymnastics.

Competition schedule 
The competition featured senior and junior competitions for both women's and men's disciplines. The competition schedule was as follows (all times in central):

Friday, February 25:
 Nastia Liukin Cup, 1:30 p.m.
 Winter Cup Men's Day 1, 6:30 p.m.

Saturday, February 26:
 Winter Cup Senior Women, noon
 Elite Team Cup, 5:30 p.m.

Sunday, February 27:
 Winter Cup Junior Women, noon
 Winter Cup Men's Day 2, 5:30 p.m.

Sponsorship 
The 2022 Winter Cup was sponsored by apparel manufacturers Ozone and Turn.

Medalists

National team 
Male gymnasts were contending for spots on the men's national team.  After the conclusion of the competition the following members were named:

 2021 World medalists:
 Brody Malone
 Stephen Nedoroscik

 Top 5 all-around after the first day of competition:
 Vitaliy Guimaraes
 Khoi Young
 Asher Hong
 Yul Moldauer
 Colt Walker

 Individual event winners
 Alex Diab (rings)
 Curran Phillips (parallel bars)

 Discretionary 
 Paul Juda

 10-points program
 Ian Lasic-Ellis
 Riley Loos

 Petition
 Cameron Bock
 Shane Wiskus
 Alec Yoder

Participants

Men 

 Michael Artlip (Penn State University)
 Fuzzy Benas (University of Oklahoma)
 Jeremy Bischoff (Stanford University)
 Landen Blixt (Infinity Gymnastics Academy)
 Crew Bold (University of Michigan)
 Garrett Braunton (United States Air Force Academy)
 Taylor Burkhart (Stanford Boys Gymnastics)
 Matt Cormier (Penn State University)
 Mathew Davis (Army West Point)
 Evan Davis (Iowa GymACT)
 Alex Diab (USOPTC)
 Isaiah Drake (United States Naval Academy)
 Mike Fletcher (University of Illinois)
 Jack Freeman (University of Oklahoma)
 James Friedman (Iowa GymACT)
 Raydel Gamboa (University of Oklahoma)
 Vitaliy Guimaraes (University of Oklahoma)
 Ian Gunther (Stanford University)
 Dallas Hale (Cypress Academy of Gymnastics)
 Kazuki Hayashi (Ohio State University)
 Asher Hong (Cypress Academy of Gymnastics)
 Evan Hymanson (Stanford Boys Gymnastics)
 Michael Jaroh (Penn State University)
 Paul Juda (University of Michigan)
 Nicolas Kuebler (Stanford University)
 Ian Lasic-Ellis (Stanford University)
 Toby Liang (Roswell Gymnastics)
 Riley Loos (Stanford University)
 Caleb Melton (Apollo Gymnastics)
 Yul Moldauer (5280 Gymnastics)
 Robert Neff (USPOTC)
 Noah Newfeld (University of California - Berkeley)
 Zachary Nunez (University of Oklahoma)
 Cole Partridge (USA Gymnastics World)
 
 Curran Phillips (Stanford University)
 Fred Richard (Massachusetts Elite Gymnastics Academy)
 Blake Sun (Stanford University)
 Colin Van Wicklen (University of Oklahoma)
 Colt Walker (University of Stanford)
 David Willett (University of Michigan)
 Ignacio Yockers (Pride Gymnastics Academy)
 Khoi Young (Stanford University)

Women

Senior 

 Ciena Alipio (Midwest Gymnastics Center)
 Sydney Barros (World Champions Centre)
 Skye Blakely (WOGA Gymnastics)
 Charlotte Booth (Brandy Johnson's Global Gymnastics)
 
 Addison Fatta (Prestige Gymnastics)
 eMjae Frazier (Parkettes National Gymnastics Training Center)
 Karis German (World Champions Centre)
 Katelyn Jong (Metroplex Gymnastics)
 Kaliya Lincoln (WOGA Gymnastics)
 Lauren Little (Everest)
 Konnor McClain (WOGA Gymnastics)
 Zoe Miller (World Champions Centre)
 Kaylen Morgan (Everest Gymnastics)
 Marissa Neal (Great American Gymnastics Express)
 Brooke Pierson (WOGA Gymnastics)
 Joscelyn Roberson (North East Texas Elite Gymnastics)
 Katelyn Rosen (Twin City Twisters)
 Ashlee Sullivan (WOGA Gymnastics)
 Lexi Zeiss (Twin City Twisters)

Junior 

 Adriana Consoli (Pearland Elite)
 Nicole Desmond (First State Gymnastics)
 Amelia Disidore (Great American Gymnastics Express)
 Kieryn Finnell (Rochester Gymnastics Academy)
 Jayla Hang (Ascend Gymnastics Center)
 Gabrielle Hardie (Twin City Twisters)
 Madray Johnson (WOGA Gymnastics)
 Avery King (WOGA Gymnastics)
 Myli Lew (San Mateo Gymnastics)
 Annalisa Milton (Great American Gymnastics Express)
 Zoey Molomo (Metroplex)
 Ella Murphy (WOGA Gymnastics)
 Ella Kate Parker (Cincinnati Gymnastics)
 Claire Pease (WOGA Gymnastics)
 Michelle Pineda (Metroplex Gymnastics)
 Azaraya Ra-Akbar (World Class Gymnastics)
 Hezly Rivera (WOGA Gymnastics)
 Simone Rose (Ascend Gymnastics Center)
 Audrey Snyder (First State Gymnastics)
 Tiana Sumanasekera (West Valley Gymnastics School)
 Gabby Van Frayen (Gym X-Treme)

Nastia Liukin Cup 

The 13th annual Nastia Liukin Cup was held in conjunction with the 2022 Winter Cup.  For the first time it was held in Frisco, Texas, the hometown of Nastia Liukin.

Medal winners

References 

U.S. Winter Cup
Gymnastics
Winter Cup
Winter Cup
Winter Cup